1869 Philoctetes  is a Jupiter trojan from the Greek camp, approximately 23 kilometers in diameter.

It was discovered on September 24, 1960, by the Dutch and Dutch–American astronomers Cornelis van Houten, Ingrid van Houten-Groeneveld and Tom Gehrels at Palomar Observatory on Palomar Mountain, California. The asteroid was named after  Philoctetes from Greek mythology. On the same night, the same group also discovered 1868 Thersites.

Orbit and classification 

Philoctetes orbits in the  Lagrangian point of the Sun–Jupiter system, in the "Greek Camp" of Trojan asteroids. It orbits the Sun at a distance of 4.9–5.6 AU once every 11 years and 11 months (4,353 days). Its orbit has an eccentricity of 0.07 and an inclination of 4° with respect to the ecliptic.

Physical characteristics 

According to the survey carried out by NASA's Wide-field Infrared Survey Explorer with its subsequent NEOWISE mission, Philoctetes measures 22.7 kilometers in diameter, and its surface has an albedo of 0.104.

As of 2017, the body's rotation period and shape remain unknown.

Survey designation 

The survey designation P-L stands for Palomar–Leiden, named after Palomar Observatory and Leiden Observatory, which collaborated on the fruitful Palomar–Leiden survey in the 1960s. Gehrels used Palomar's Samuel Oschin telescope (also known as the 48-inch Schmidt Telescope), and shipped the photographic plates to Cornelis Johannes van Houten and Ingrid van Houten-Groeneveld at Leiden Observatory. The trio are credited with several thousand asteroid discoveries.

Naming 

This minor planet was named after the Greek mythological figure Philoctetes, famed archer and participant in the Trojan War, where he killed Paris, son of the Trojan King Priam. The official  was published by the Minor Planet Center on 1 June 1975.

References

External links 
 Asteroid Lightcurve Database (LCDB), query form (info )
 Dictionary of Minor Planet Names, Google books
 Asteroids and comets rotation curves, CdR – Observatoire de Genève, Raoul Behrend
 Discovery Circumstances: Numbered Minor Planets (1)-(5000) – Minor Planet Center
 
 

001869
Discoveries by Cornelis Johannes van Houten
Discoveries by Ingrid van Houten-Groeneveld
Discoveries by Tom Gehrels
4596
Named minor planets
19600924